Charleswood was a provincial electoral division in the Canadian province of Manitoba. It was created by redistribution in 1968, and formally existed from the provincial election of 1969 until that of 2019. The riding was in the westernmost tip of Manitoba's capital and largest city, Winnipeg.

Charleswood was bordered to the east by Tuxedo and Fort Whyte, to the north by Kirkfield Park, and to the south and west by the rural riding of Morris.

Charleswood's population in 1996 was 20,262. The riding's character is middle- and upper-middle class: in 1999, the average family income was $70,417, and the unemployment rate was 5.20%. Eleven per cent of the riding's residents are immigrants, with over half being of German origin.

The service sector accounts for 15% of Charleswood's industry, with a further 12% in the retail trade and 11% in health and social sciences.

Members of the Progressive Conservative Party represented Charleswood throughout its lifetime. Sterling Lyon was premier of Manitoba from 1977 to 1981 while representing Charleswood.

List of provincial representatives

Electoral results

1969 general election

1973 general election

1977 general election

1981 general election

1986 general election

1988 general election

1990 general election

1995 general election

1998 by-election

1999 general election

2003 general election

2007 general election

2011 general election

2016 general election

Previous boundaries

References

Former provincial electoral districts of Manitoba
Politics of Winnipeg